Kolekcja wilanowska is an art collection displayed at the Museum of King John III's Palace at Wilanów at the Wilanów Palace in Warsaw, Poland. The museum was established in 1805 by Stanisław Kostka Potocki.

See also
 Poster Museum at Wilanów

External links

 Website
 The Wilanów Palace Museum in the Google Art Project

Museums in Warsaw
Museums established in 1805
Art museums and galleries in Poland
1805 establishments in Prussia